Charles Denton Leech (18 December 1789 – June 1851) was an English cricketer with amateur status who was associated with Suffolk and made his first-class debut in 1830.

References

1789 births
1851 deaths
English cricketers
English cricketers of 1826 to 1863
Suffolk cricketers